Cubana de Aviación Flight 1216 was a McDonnell Douglas DC-10 that overran the runway at La Aurora International Airport, Guatemala City, on 21 December 1999. Eight passengers and eight crew members on board were killed as well as two people on the ground.

Aircraft and crew

The aircraft involved was a McDonnell Douglas DC-10, registration F-GTDI, leased by Cubana de Aviación from AOM French Airlines. It was just under 27 years old and had flown 85,760 hours at the time of the accident. It had been previously owned by Air Afrique with registration TU-TAL and was involved in the hijacking of Air Afrique Flight 056. 

The captain was 54-year-old Jorge Toledo, who had been a DC-10 captain since 1993 and was flying for Cubana de Aviación since 1972. He had 16,117 flight hours, including 4,872 hours on the DC-10. The first officer was 41-year-old Cecelio Hernandez, who had been a DC-10 first officer since 1993 and was flying for Cubana de Aviación since 1978. He had previously been a captain of the Yakovlev Yak-42 aircraft. Hernandez had 8,115 flight hours, with 4,156 of them on the DC-10. The 59-year-old flight engineer Moises Borges was the most experienced member of the crew; had been a DC-10 flight engineer since 1992 and was flying for Cubana de Aviación since 1966. and logging 22,819 flight hours, including 4,939 on the DC-10.

Accident
Flight 1216 was a special charter transporting Guatemalan students home from universities in Cuba. The aircraft took off from José Martí International Airport in Cuba with 296 passengers and 18 crew on board. After a two-hour flight the aircraft was cleared to land on Runway 19 at La Aurora International Airport. On landing the pilots were unable to stop the aircraft and it ran off the end of the runway and down a slope, crashing into ten houses. The accident killed 18 people in all: eight passengers and eight crew members on board the aircraft, and two occupants of the houses. There were 298 passengers and crew who survived; however 37 passengers and crew and another 20 people on the ground were injured in the accident. The aircraft was damaged beyond repair and written off.

The crash occurred in the La Libertad neighborhood. All three flight crew members were among the dead. Among the dead was stewardess Johanna Toledo, who was the captain's daughter.

Cause
The accident was investigated by the Accident Investigation Section of Guatemala's General Directorate of Civil Aeronautics. The investigation found that the aircraft touched down too far along the wet runway with insufficient deceleration, and that the crew had failed to initiate a go-around. The spoilers was found in the down and locked position, while the flight data recorder (FDR) showed them deployed. The handle for the spoilers in the cockpit was found in an undefined position. The reason for this discrepancy was not determined by the accident investigation.

See also

Cubana de Aviación accidents and incidents

References

External links
  "INFORME FINAL ACCIDENTE AEROPUERTO LA AURORA, PISTA 19 CIUDAD DE GUATEMALA, GUATEMALA. [FINAL ACCIDENT REPORT LA AURORA AIRPORT, RUNWAY 19 GUATEMALA CITY, GUATEMALA]" (Archive, PDF, Archive of PDF) General Directorate of Civil Aeronautics. Hosted by the Bureau of Enquiry and Analysis for Civil Aviation Safety (BEA)

Aviation accidents and incidents in 1999
Aviation accidents and incidents in Guatemala
Accidents and incidents involving the McDonnell Douglas DC-10
Airliner accidents and incidents involving runway overruns
1999 in Guatemala
December 1999 events in North America
1216